Michael Federico is an American baseball coach, currently serving as the head baseball coach at the University of Louisiana at Monroe. Federico attended college at the University of Southern Mississippi and played on the Southern Miss Golden Eagles baseball team. Federico served as an assistant baseball coach at the University of Memphis from 2005 to 2009, and at the University of Southern Mississippi from 2010 to 2017. Federico was named head baseball coach at the University of Louisiana at Monroe on June 27, 2017.

Head coaching record

References

External links
 Louisiana–Monroe profile
 Southern Miss profile

Living people
Southern Miss Golden Eagles baseball players
Louisiana–Monroe Warhawks baseball coaches
Memphis Tigers baseball coaches
Southern Miss Golden Eagles baseball coaches
Year of birth missing (living people)
Place of birth missing (living people)
Hinds Eagles baseball players
Meridian Eagles baseball coaches